Edward H. (Ed) Sussenguth Jr. (October 10, 1932 – November 22, 2015) was an American engineer and former IBM employee, known best for his work on Systems Network Architecture (SNA). He was also a contributor to the architecture of IBM's Advanced Computer System (ACS).

Biography 
Born in Holyoke, Massachusetts, Sussenguth received a Bachelor of Arts (A.B.) in 1954 from Harvard University, a Master of Science (M.S.) in electrical engineering in 1959 from Massachusetts Institute of Technology (MIT), and a Doctor of Philosophy (Ph.D.) in 1964 from Harvard.

After he served at the United States Navy as an officer in the Pacific Fleet, Sussenguth joined IBM in 1959. Sussenguth started in 1959 in the Research Division in the development of formal language descriptions.

This work led to Sussenguth meeting Kenneth E. Iverson and Adin Falkoff. Iverson had developed a formal notation, which was documented in a book A Programming Language. It was the original version of the programming language APL. Chapter 2 of A Programming Language had used Iverson's notation to describe the IBM 7090 computer. In early 1963, Falkoff, later joined by Iverson and Sussenguth, proceeded to use the notation to produce a formal description of the IBM System/360 computer then under design. The result was published in 1964 in a double issue of the IBM Systems Journal, thereafter known as the "grey book" or "grey manual". The book was used in a course on computer systems design at the IBM Systems Research Institute.

In 1965, Sussenguth joined the IBM Advanced Computer Systems project (ACS-1) to work on high performance computers. In 1970, he became Director of Architecture and Planning in the new Communications Systems Division, where he turned his attention to networking and high speed communications. In the last year before his retirement in 1990, he was appointed first President of the IBM Academy of Technology, which he held for a year.

Sussenguth was an advisor to the National Bureau of Standards and a visiting professor at some universities. He was elected Fellow of the Institute of Electrical and Electronics Engineers (IEEE) and received multiple awards and honors, including: in 1981, an IBM Fellowship for "technical leadership in the development of system network architecture"; in 1988, the Data Communications Interface Award; in 1989, the IEEE Simon Ramo Medal; in 1992, he was elected a member of the National Academy of Engineering (computer science).

Publications 
Sussenguth has authored and co-authored multiple publications, including:

References

External links 
 National Academy of Engineering (NAE): Dr. Edward H. Sussenguth

1932 births
2015 deaths
21st-century American engineers
Harvard University alumni
MIT School of Engineering alumni
IBM employees
Fellow Members of the IEEE
Members of the United States National Academy of Engineering
Systems Network Architecture